Elena Zangor (born 19 June 1933) is a Romanian cross-country skier. She competed in the women's 3 × 5 kilometre relay at the 1956 Winter Olympics.

References

External links
 

1933 births
Living people
Romanian female cross-country skiers
Olympic cross-country skiers of Romania
Cross-country skiers at the 1956 Winter Olympics